Killisnoo was an unincorporated community on Killisnoo Island in the Hoonah-Angoon Census Area in the U.S. state of Alaska, near Angoon which is on Admiralty Island. It is noted to have had a post office which closed in 1930. It has also been known by several names which include Kanas-nu, Kanasnu, Kenasnow and Killishoo.

History

Killisnoo Island has long been inhabited by Tlingit people. In the late 1800s, the North West Trading Company built a fish processing plant at Killisnoo and many Tlingit moved from nearby Angoon and other areas to Killisnoo to work at the plant. The plant was destroyed in a fire in 1928 and most of the residents left Killisnoo.

The St. Andrew Church in Killisnoo was destroyed by fire in 1927, and the congregation built a new church called St. John the Baptist church in Angoon.

Like Angoon, Killisnoo has a less-rainy climate than most of southeastern Alaska, which is why Killisnoo is now the home of a fishing and hunting establishment by the name of Whaler's Cove Lodge.

Demographics

Killisnoo first appeared on the 1890 U.S. Census as an unincorporated village of 79 residents. Although it was considered to be a Tlingit village, Whites outnumbered Tlingits by 44 to 33, with 2 Asians. It continued to appear until 1940, when most of the residents left. It was later annexed into the neighboring city of Angoon.

References

External links and further reading
A Russian American Photographer in Tlingit Country: Vincent Soboleff in Alaska by Sergei Kan, University of Oklahoma Press 2013, hardcover, 271 pages, 137 black and white photographs of people and scenes in Killisnoo and southeastern Alaska taken circa 1910, 
"A Russian-American Photographing Native Alaska" illustrated review by Maurice Berger in the photography blog "Lens" in The New York Times July 17, 2013

Unincorporated communities in Hoonah–Angoon Census Area, Alaska
Unincorporated communities in Alaska
Unincorporated communities in Unorganized Borough, Alaska